Hiad or variation, may refer to:

 NASA Hypersonic Inflatable Aerodynamic Decelerator
 High Adhesion truck (HiAd); see List of GE locomotives
 HIAD 650 AM, Santo Domingo, Dominican Republic; a radio station

See also

 Hayling Island Amateur Dramatic Society (HIADS), Station Theatre (Hayling Island), Hayling Island, Hampshire, England, UK